Elisabeth Beck-Gernsheim (born 14 October 1946 in Freiburg), is a German sociologist. She holds a professorship at the University of Erlangen-Nuremberg.

After studying sociology, psychology, and philosophy in Munich, she obtained her PhD in 1973. After several fellowships, she graduated from Munich University in 1987.

Her main research interest is in social changes and the changing situation of the institution of the family. She was married to German sociologist Ulrich Beck until his death in 2015.

Works
Das halbierte Leben (1980)
Vom Geburtenrückgang zum ganz normalen Leben (1984)

Das ganz normale Chaos der Liebe (1990)

Was kommt nach der Familie? (2000)

"Ein Türke geht nicht in die Oper" – was Deutsche über Türken wissen, in: Robertson-von Trotha, Caroline Y. (ed.): Kultur und Gerechtigkeit (= Kulturwissenschaft interdisziplinär/Interdisciplinary Studies on Culture and Society, Vol. 2), Baden-Baden 2007,

References

External links
Elisabeth Beck-Gernsheim: Die Kinderfrage
"Prof. Dr. Elisabeth Beck-Gernsheim", LMU Ringvorlesung: "Wir und die anderen" Voraussetzungen für Gewalt und Frieden
Private Homepage of Elisabeth Beck-Gernsheim

German sociologists
1946 births
Living people
German women sociologists
Family sociologists